Rustin may refer to:

People
 Bayard Rustin (1912–1987), American civil rights activist
 Jean Rustin (1928–2013), French painter

Places
 Ruştin, a village in Cornereva Commune, Caraş-Severin, Romania

Film and television
 Rustin, a 2001 American film, directed by and starring former CFL all-star quarterback Rick Johnson
 Rustin (film), an upcoming American film
 Rust Cohle or Rustin, a fictional character from the television series True Detective

See also
 Ruston (disambiguation)
 West Chester Rustin High School, a high school in Pennsylvania named after Bayard Rustin